Dosthill Colts F.C. is a Junior's football club based in the Dosthill area of Tamworth, England. The Senior side were members of the Midland Football Combination Premier Division. They were formed in 1990 by Gary Onions and Steve Brownlees.  In 2011, the first team merged with Coleshill Town. The Juniors have representative teams in the Tamworth and Central Warwickshire Leagues.

External links

Defunct football clubs in England
Association football clubs established in 1990
Association football clubs disestablished in 2011
1990 establishments in England
2011 disestablishments in England
Sport in Tamworth, Staffordshire
Defunct football clubs in Staffordshire